Tony Bin (1983–2000) was an Irish-bred Thoroughbred racehorse who competed in Europe for his Italian owner from a base in Milan and became a leading sire in Japan.

Background
Bred by Pat O'Callaghan, Tony Bin was foaled on 7 April 1983. He was a son of Rathbarry Stud's Kampala and out of the mare Severn Bridge by Hornbeam. The colt was a descendant of the great Nearco through both his sire and his dam.  O'Callaghan sold him for 3,000 guineas to the Allevamento White Star breeding and racing operation of Italian businessman Luciano Gaucci.

Racing career
Tony Bin was trained by Luigi Camici. At age two, his best result in a major race was a third in the GI Gran Criterium at Milan's San Siro Racecourse. As a three-year-old in 1986, he finished second in the GI Gran Premio del Jockey Club.

In 1987 at age four, Tony Bin won some of Italy's most prestigious Group One events, including the Gran Premio del Jockey Club, Premio Presidente della Repubblica and Gran Premio di Milano, repeating as winner of the latter two in 1988. Sent to race in France and England, he ran second in the 1988 Grand Prix de Saint-Cloud and third to Mtoto in the 1988 King George VI and Queen Elizabeth Stakes. In October, he beat Mtoto in France's most prestigious race, the Prix de l'Arc de Triomphe.

Assessment
At the end of the 1988 season, Tony Bin was officially rated the equal of Mtoto as the best older male horse in Europe, one pound behind the filly Miesque. Timeform also could not divide Tony Bin and Mtoto, awarding both horses a rating of 134 and making them the best older horses of either sex, one pound ahead of Miesque and the British filly Indian Skimmer.

Stud record
Tony Bin was sold for US$4 million to the Zenya Yoshida family of Japan. He stood at stud at their Shadai Stallion Station in Shiraoi, Hokkaido, where he met with considerable success. The leading sire in Japan in 1994, Tony Bin produced progeny that includes:
 Air Groove (1993) – Horse of the Year and 1997 Champion Older Mare in Japan. In July 2004, her foal (later named The Sunday Fusaichi) by Dance in the Dark sold for ¥490,000,000 (US$4.54 million), making it the world's highest-priced foal and the most expensive horse ever sold at auction in Japan.
 Jungle Pocket (1998) – winner of the Tokyo Yushun and Japan Cup, voted the 2001 Japanese Horse of the Year and rated that year by Timeform as the third best three-year-old colt in the world.
 Narita Century (1999) – Japanese stakes winner of US$2,466,527.
 North Flight (1990) – winner of Yasuda Kinen and Mile Championship.
 Telegnosis (1999) – winner of GI NHK Mile Cup with career earnings of more than US$3 million.
 Vega (1990) – winner of the 1993 Oka Sho (Japanese 1000 Guineas) and Yushun Himba (Japanese Oaks).
 Winning Ticket (1990) – winner of the 1993 Tokyo Yushun (Japanese Derby).

Tony Bin sired other Grade I millionaire winners and was also the damsire of the Japanese colt Heart's Cry, winner of the 2006 Dubai Sheema Classic, who handed Deep Impact his first-ever loss in winning the 2005 Arima Kinen.

Tony Bin Died on 10 March 2000 unexpectedly of heart failure at the age of seventeen.

Pedigree

References 

1983 racehorse births
2000 racehorse deaths
Arc winners
Racehorses bred in Ireland
Racehorses trained in Italy
Thoroughbred family 19-b